Ben M'Sick or Ben Msik is a district of southern Casablanca, in the Casablanca-Settat region of Morocco. The district covers an area of 10.27 square kilometres (3.97 square miles) and as of 2004 had 285,879 inhabitants.

Subdivisions
The district is divided into two arrondissements:

Ben M'Sick (arrondissement)
Sbata

References

Districts of Casablanca